The Government of the People's Republic of Bangladesh ( — ) is the central executive government of Bangladesh. The government was constituted by the Constitution of Bangladesh consisting the executive represented by the president, prime minister and cabinet. The legislature represented by the Jatiya Sangsad and the judiciary, represented by the Supreme Court. Bangladesh is a unitary state and the central government has the authority to govern over the entirety of the nation. The seat of the government is located in Dhaka, the capital of Bangladesh.

The executive government is led by the prime minister, who selects all the remaining ministers. The prime minister and the other most senior ministers belong to the supreme decision-making committee, known as the Cabinet. The current prime minister is Sheikh Hasina, leader of the Bangladesh Awami League, who was sworn-in by the president on 6 January 2009 following the general election on 29 December 2008. The Awami League led by her, and its Grand Alliance (a total of 14 parties) won two-thirds majority in the elections. Numerically, the party controls 230 seats out of 299.

Head of state
The President is the Head of State, a largely ceremonial post. The real power is held by the Prime Minister, who is the head of government. The president is elected by the legislature every five years and has normally limited powers that are substantially expanded during the tenure of a caretaker government, mainly in controlling the transition to a new government. Bangladesh has instituted a unique system of transfer of power; at the end of the tenure of the government, power is handed over to members of a civil society for three months, who run the general elections and transfer the power to elected representatives. This system was first practiced in 1991 and adopted to the constitution in 1996.

As head of the state, the president can grant pardon to a man sentenced to death penalty or lessen the punishment. In some cases, it also performs some legislative and judicial functions.

Prime Minister
The prime minister is ceremonially appointed by the president, commanding the confidence of the majority of the MPs. The cabinet is composed of selected ministers.
Prime minister exercise supreme power in Bangladesh.

Cabinet

The executive administrates the country and executes the laws, passed by the legislature. It maintains the internal law and order in the country. It also maintains relationship with foreign countries. It works for defence, liberty and sovereignty of the country.

Agencies

The executive calculates the income and expenditure of the government. It also performs various public welfare services such as; education, agriculture, establishment of industry, trade & commerce, land reform, tax and revenue collection. Beside this, it also accepts and implements various development projects.

Government in Parliament 

The legislature of Bangladesh is unicameral. Called the Jatiya Sangsad in Bengali, it is the parliament of Bangladesh. The Speaker presides over meetings of the Jatiya Sangsad and conducts its business in an orderly fashion. The current Jatiya Sangsad contains 350 seats, including 50 seats reserved exclusively for women and 300 seats for elected members, which are apportioned on elected party position in the parliament. The eleventh national parliamentary election was held on 30 December 2018. The current speaker is Shirin Sharmin Chaudhury, who is presiding over the eleventh Parliament. She is the first woman to have held this office.

Local Government

At the local government level, the country is divided into divisions, districts, subdistricts (Upazila), unions, and villages. The lowest level of local government representative are Local officials of union council those who are elected at the union level election. All larger administrative units are run by members of the civil service.

Finance

Taxation

Annual budget

Issues

Corruption

Separation of powers

See also
 Politics of Bangladesh
 List of office-holders in the Government of Bangladesh

References

 
Asian governments
Politics of Bangladesh